Lucius Postumius Albinus was a politician of ancient Rome, of patrician rank, of the 2nd century BC.  He was curule aedile  in 161 BC, and exhibited the Ludi Megalenses, at which Terence's play Eunuchus had debuted.  He was consul in 154 BC, and died seven days after he had set out from Rome in order to go to his province.  It was supposed that he was poisoned by his wife, Publilia.

He was also Flamen Martialis in 168 BC until his death.

Family

He was apparently son of Spurius Postumius Albinus.

See also
 Postumia gens

References

154 BC deaths
2nd-century BC Roman consuls
Deaths by poisoning
Roman aediles
Roman consuls who died in office
Roman Republican praetors
Lucius 600
Year of birth unknown